Springside is a town in Saskatchewan, Canada within Rural Municipality of Orkney No. 244. It is located about 24km northwest of the city of Yorkton along the Yellowhead Highway.

History 
Springs of pure water along the old Dakota trail attracted settlers to make the present site of Springside, a main stopping place on their trek farther west. The CP railway line was laid parallel with this trail and the siding was named Patrick in honour of the Yorkton district pioneer doctor, T. A. Patrick. The first settlers in the vicinity of the village were from the British Isles or from Ontario, also of British extraction. To the north east of Springside, Ukrainians homesteaded and to the northwest, German-speaking peoples made homes on their claims.  By 1903 the railway was under construction and a post office was being considered for the newly incorporated village however another community in the territory was already named Patrick so it was decided that the name should be changed. The presence of the springs beside the trail prompted the residents to petition the Post Master General to call the post office Springside. F. H. Willis was appointed post master that summer and received the first batch of mail on July 1, 1904.  The Saskatchewan government declared Springside a village in 1909.  During the Great Depression the Yellowhead Highway was built linking Springside to nearby Yorkton through the efforts of A. C. Stewart, Minister of Highways and Member for Yorkton.  As a result, many businesses and services began to close down as people travelled to Yorkton to shop.  In 1985, Springside officially became a town.

Demographics 

Education 
Springside has one school that covers Kindergarten through grade 8 in the Good Spirit School Division. Enrollment for 2008 is 95 students.

Attractions

Springside is close to Spiritwood Acres 18-hole golf course and Good Spirit Provincial Park as well a Theodore Dam.  Springside has opportunities for swimming, boating, fishing for pike, perch and pickerel. as well as ice fishing, cross country ski trails, snowmobile trails, hunting for geese, ducks and deer.  Nearby is an elk farm and to the south (approximately 32 km.) is a bison farm. 

Springside Attractions Gallery

Transportation 
Originally located along the old Dakota Trail, Springside today is serviced by the Canadian Pacific Railway as well as Highway 47 and Highway 16 (Yellowhead Highway.)

Notable people 

 Clarke Breitkreuz (born 1991), Canadian Ice Hockey Player
Brett Breitkreuz (born 1989), Canadian ice hockey player
 Carman Davies (born 1968), Insurance salesman for Federated Insurance

See also 

 List of communities in Saskatchewan
 List of towns in Saskatchewan

References

External links 

Towns in Saskatchewan
Orkney No. 244, Saskatchewan
Division No. 9, Saskatchewan